Senator Dwyer may refer to:

Bernard J. Dwyer (1921–1998), New Jersey State Senate
R. Budd Dwyer (1939–1987), Pennsylvania State Senate

See also
Senator Dyer (disambiguation)